Safarabad (also Romanized as Şafarābād; also known as Qeshlāq-e Şafarābād) is a village in Qomrud Rural District, in the Central District of Qom County, Qom Province, Iran. At the 2006 census, its population was 32, in 9 families.

References 

Populated places in Qom Province